White Bull (Lakota: Tȟatȟáŋka Ská) (April 1849 – June 21, 1947) was the nephew of Sitting Bull, and a famous warrior in his own right. White Bull participated in the Battle of the Little Bighorn on June 25, 1876.

Early life
Born in the Black Hills in South Dakota, White Bull came from a prominent Sioux family. He was the son of Makes Room, a Miniconjou chief and the brother of One Bull. After the battle, White Bull joined his uncle, Hunkpapa Sioux leader Sitting Bull, while fleeing to Canada. Also, young Chief Solomon "Smoke" and Chief No Neck (Lakota: Tȟahú Waníče) (these two chiefs were the sons of the old Chief Smoke 1774–1864), fled with White Bull and Sitting Bull and their bands to Canada.

Little Bighorn
For years it was rumored that White Bull boasted of killing Lt. Col. George Armstrong Custer at the infamous battle. However, others who knew White Bull claim that he never made that statement but instead admitted to struggling with Custer.

White Bull surrendered to government troops in 1876. He eventually became a chief, replacing his father Chief Makes Room upon his death. He acted as a judge of the Court of Indian Offenses, and was a proponent of Lakota land claims in the Black Hills. White Bull died in South Dakota in 1947.

White Bull's relationship to his uncle made him an important contributor to Stanley Vestal's biography of Sitting Bull.

Popular culture
White Bull, played by Sal Mineo, was used as a character in the 1958 Disney Western adventure film Tonka.

References

Further reading
Stanley Vestal, Warpath: The True Story of the Fighting Sioux Told in a Biography of Chief White Bull (University of Nebraska Press, First Bison Book printing, 1984) 
The Warrior Who Killed Custer: The Personal Narrative of Chief Joseph White Bull. Translated and Edited By James H. Howard. Lincoln: University of Nebraska Press, 1968.
Lakota Warrior: A Personal Narrative. Edited by James H. Howard. Lincoln: University of Nebraska Press, 1998.

External links
Sioux History in Pictures (The White Bull Manuscript) at The University of North Dakota
The Man Who Killed Custer American Heritage Magazine

1849 births
1947 deaths
People from South Dakota
Lakota leaders
People of the Great Sioux War of 1876
Miniconjou people